Star is a hamlet in central Alberta, Canada within Lamont County.

Demographics 
Star recorded a population of 32 in the 1991 Census of Population conducted by Statistics Canada.

See also 
Edna-Star Colony

References 

Hamlets in Alberta
Lamont County